Burträsk is a locality situated in Skellefteå Municipality, Västerbotten County, Sweden with 1,575 inhabitants in 2010. It is notable as the only place where Västerbotten cheese is made.

Burträsk Court District, or Burträsks tingslag, was a district of Västerbotten in Sweden. The provinces in Norrland were never divided into hundreds and instead the court district (tingslag) served as the basic division of rural areas.

Burträsk Fault is named after the village.

People
Edvin Larsson (1925–2009), theologian.

References 

Populated places in Västerbotten County
Populated places in Skellefteå Municipality